Pattie may refer to:

Food
 Savoury pattie, a fried mashed potato dish from Hull in England
 York Peppermint Pattie, a chocolate confectionery

People

Given name
 Pattie Boyd (born 1944), English model, photographer and author
 Pattie Brooks, American singer
 Pattie Coldwell (1952–2002), British TV presenter and journalist
 Pattie Deakin (1863–1934), wife of Australian Prime Minister Alfred Deakin
 Pattie Howard, American gospel and R&B singer
 Pattie Mallette (born 1975), Canadian author and film producer
 Pattie Menzies (1899–1995), wife of Australian Prime Minister Sir Robert Menzies
 Pattie Obey, American Jazz dance choreographer
 Little Pattie (born 1949), Australian singer

Surname
 Brian Pattie (born 1975), American auto-racing crew chief
 Geoffrey Pattie (born 1936), British Conservative politician and Member of Parliament
 James Ohio Pattie (c. 1804–1851), American frontiersman and author

Other uses
 Dame Pattie, International 12-metre class racing yacht

See also
 Patty (disambiguation)
 Patti (disambiguation)
 Patricia